The 2004 Atlantic Sun men's basketball tournament was held March 4–6 at the Curb Event Center at Belmont University in Nashville, Tennessee. 

 defeated top-seeded, reigning champions   in the championship game, 60–55, to win their third Atlantic Sun/TAAC men's basketball tournament.

The Golden Knights, therefore, received the Atlantic Sun's automatic bid to the 2004 NCAA tournament.

Format
Even though the Atlantic Sun's membership decreased from twelve to eleven (Jacksonville State departed for the Ohio Valley) no changes to the format were made. As such, only the top eight teams from the conference tournament were eligible for the tournament. These eight teams were seeded based on regular season conference records and were all entered into the quarterfinal round.

Bracket

References

ASUN men's basketball tournament
Tournament
Atlantic Sun men's basketball tournament
Atlantic Sun men's basketball tournament